Wetaskiwin is the name of several places in western Canada, named after the Cree word wītaskīwin-ispatinaw (ᐑᑕᐢᑮᐏᐣ ᐃᐢᐸᑎᓇᐤ), meaning "the hills where peace was made":

Wetaskiwin, a city in Alberta, Canada
County of Wetaskiwin No. 10, a county in Alberta, Canada
Wetaskiwin Regional Airport, airport near Wetaskiwin, Alberta, Canada
Wetaskiwin Regional Division No. 11, a school divisions in Alberta, Canada
Wetaskiwin (electoral district) - a federal electoral district in Alberta, Canada
Wetaskiwin-Camrose, a provincial electoral district in Alberta, Canada
Wetaskiwin (N.W.T. electoral district), former territorial electoral district in the Northwest Territories, Canada
HMCS Wetaskiwin (K175), a ship of the Royal Canadian Navy named after the city